Kilaguni Airport is an airport in Kenya.

Location
The airport,  is located in Kilaguni, Taita-Taveta County inside Tsavo East National Park, in southeastern Kenya, close to the International border with the Republic of Tanzania.

The geographic coordinates of this airport are:2° 54' 0.00"N, 38° 4' 26.00"E (Latitude:-2.900000; Longitude:38.073889).

Overview
Kilaguni Airport is a small airport that serves the location of Kilaguni and the adjacent areas of  Tsavo National Park.

Airlines and destinations

See also
 Kenya Airports Authority
 Kenya Civil Aviation Authority
 List of airports in Kenya

References

External links
   Location of Kilagoni Airport At Google Maps
  Website of Kenya Airports Authority
  Airkenya Flight Routes
 

Airports in Kenya
Coast Province
Taita-Taveta County
Tsavo National Park